Unstoppable Momentum is the fourteenth studio album by guitarist Joe Satriani, released on May 7, 2013 through Epic Records. The album reached No. 42 on the U.S. Billboard 200 and remained on that chart for three weeks, as well as reaching the top 100 in nine other countries.

Release and tour
Recording for Unstoppable Momentum took place from late 2012 to early 2013 and the title was announced on February 21, 2013. The track listing and cover art were revealed on March 19. A full-length preview of "A Door into Summer" was made available at Premier Guitar on April 8, along with a review of the album. Touring began in Europe from May to July, followed by North America from August to October.

During recording, Satriani collaborated with Jane's Addiction bassist and noted session musician Chris Chaney. Regarding the recording process, Chaney noted, "[It] was great. I was very fortunate to get a call to do some recording with him. A great keyboardist and all-around multi-instrumentalist named Mike Keneally, who had played with Frank Zappa forever, and then the drummer, one of my favorites of all time, named Vinnie Colaiuta, who plays with Jeff Beck and countless other amazing musicians, we went up to Skywalker Ranch, up in the Bay area, for about two weeks and we just cut a song or two a day. Joe is a prolific musician and incredibly cool and it was a lot of fun. I really enjoy sometimes stepping out of L.A. to do a project like that."

Track listing

Personnel

Joe Satriani – guitar, keyboard, harmonica, engineering, production
Mike Keneally – keyboard
Vinnie Colaiuta – drums
Chris Chaney – bass
Mike Fraser – engineering, mixing, production
Judy Kirschner – engineering
Mike Boden – digital editing
Dann Michael Thompson aka. Thomas Daniel Michaelson – digital editing assistance
Brad Salter – mixing assistance
Ryan Smith – mastering

Chart performance

Weekly charts

References

External links
Unstoppable Momentum at satriani.com

Joe Satriani albums
2013 albums
Epic Records albums
Albums produced by Mike Fraser